The Peenemünde Historical Technical Museum ( or HTM), former "Peenemünde Information Centre for History and Technology" ( or HTI) is a museum, founded in 1991, in the observation bunker and site of the former power station in Peenemünde on the island of Usedom in eastern Mecklenburg-Vorpommern in Germany. The museum is dedicated to the history of the Peenemünde Army Research Centre and the Luftwaffe test site of "Peenemünde-West", especially the rockets and missiles developed there between 1936 and 1945. Since January 2007 the information centre has become an anchor point on the European Route of Industrial Heritage (ERIH), a Europe-wide network of industrial monuments, and a part of the ERIH themed routes for Energy and Transport & Communication.

In 2008 the museum had around 222,000 visitors including many school classes. Around €6.5 M were invested in the museum's renovation and expansion; a further investment of €3.9 M is planned. In 2002 the HTM was given the Coventry Cross of Nails and in 2013 the European Union Prize for Cultural Heritage / Europa Nostra Award.

Exhibition 

The main purpose of the exhibition in the power station is to be a memorial site where visitors can learn from exhibits, documents and films about the fateful pact made by the rocket engineers around Wernher von Braun with former powers in order to develop the aerospace industry.

In the mid-1960s, building on his technical experience from Peenemünde, Wernher von Braun led the design team which developed the Saturn V rocket for NASA that was used to fly to the moon. The role of the former rocket engineer in Peenemünde, however, was to develop weapons of war. Films show visitors how V-1 flying bombs worked.

These experiences formed the basis for the development of nuclear missiles by the Allies after the war. According to documents in the exhibition even Peenemünde experts took part, including in Great Britain and France, where they helped to develop the Force de Frappe.

As part of a detailed chronicle about the test site, the living and working conditions of the forced labourers and prisoners of war in Peenemünde is illustrated. In addition, there is extensive information on concentration camp prisoners, who assembled the V1-flying bombs in Bavaria and Austria under inhuman conditions.

There is a chapel near the site which commemorates all the victims.

Open air displays 

Amongst the showpieces on display in the open-air part of the site are a replica V-1 flying bomb (Fieseler Fi 103) and the A4 rocket.

Exhibits in the Peenemünde Historical Technical Museum include:

Information boards on the Peenemünder Haken 

There is a large number of information boards at historic locations, connected with the Army Research Centre and Luftwaffe test site, spread over the whole Peenemünder Haken ("Peenemünde Hook") and managed by the HTI. The sites include Oxygen Factory II (Sauerstoffwerk II), two former forced labour camps and a halt on the old Peenemünde industrial railway. The displayed objects and terrain are generally freely accessible and often inconspicuous. Several were laid out with the help of youth volunteers.

See also
 Test Stand VII, the principal V-2 launch test facility

References

Literature 
Bernd Kuhlmann: Peenemünde - Das Raketenzentrum und seine Werkbahn, GVE-Verlag, Berlin, 2. Auflage 2003, 
Johannes Erichsen und Bernhard M. Hoppe (Hg.): Peenemünde - Mythos und Geschichte der Rakete 1923 - 1989 ; Katalog des Museums Peenemünde, Nicolai-Verlag, Berlin, 2004
Volkhard Bode und Christian Thiel: Raketenspuren - Peenemünde 1936 - 2004 ; eine historische Reportage (Mit aktuellen Fotos von Christian Thiel), Links-Verlag, Berlin, 5. Auflage 2004,

External links 

Museum website

Museums in Mecklenburg-Western Pomerania
Peenemünde Army Research Center and Airfield
World War II museums in Germany
Aerospace museums in Germany
Peenemunde, Historical Technical Museum
Technology museums in Germany
European Route of Industrial Heritage Anchor Points
Buildings and structures in Vorpommern-Greifswald